Blind Alibi is a 1938 American drama film directed by Lew Landers and written by Lionel Houser, Harry Segall and Ron Ferguson. The film stars Richard Dix, Whitney Bourne, Eduardo Ciannelli, Frances Mercer and Paul Guilfoyle. The film was released on May 20, 1938, by RKO Pictures.

Plot
Sculptor Paul Dover is trying to help his sister who is being blackmailed with some love letters she wrote in her youth by an ex-fiancé of hers.

Cast 
Richard Dix as Paul Dover 
Whitney Bourne as Julia Fraser
Eduardo Ciannelli as Mitch
Frances Mercer as Ellen
Paul Guilfoyle as Taggart
Richard Lane as Bowers	
Vinton Hayworth as Dirk
Walter Miller as Maitland
Frank M. Thomas as Larson
Solly Ward as Al
George Irving as Curator
Ace the Wonder Dog as Ace

References

External links 
 

1938 films
1938 crime drama films
American crime drama films
American black-and-white films
Films about blind people
Films directed by Lew Landers
RKO Pictures films
Films produced by Cliff Reid
1930s English-language films
1930s American films